Truth in the Wilderness is a 1913 American silent short drama film directed by Lorimer Johnston starring Charlotte Burton and George Periolat, J. Warren Kerrigan and Jack Richardson. Also starring Lillian Leighton and Vivian Rich.

External links

1913 films
1913 drama films
Silent American drama films
American silent short films
American black-and-white films
1913 short films
Films directed by Lorimer Johnston
1910s American films